Roko Prkačin (born 26 November 2002) is a Croatian professional basketball player for Girona of the Liga ACB.

Early career 
Prkačin grew up in the youth system of Cibona. At a very early age he started to stand out among his teammates. With the U-16 Cibona team, in 2017 he won U-16 Europe Youth Basketball League Tournament. He was the tournament's top scorer and was named the MVP. He also played the 2017–18 Junior ABA League and 2018–19 Junior ABA League even though he was in average two to three years younger than his teammates. In June 2019, he attended the Basketball Without Borders Europe camp in Riga, Latvia.

Professional career 
In August 2018, Cibona decided to loan Prkačin to KK Rudeš of the second-tier Croatian First League. After playing very well in Rudeš he was called-up for the Cibona senior team in January 2019. On 12 January 2019, Prkačin made his professional and Adriatic League debut for Cibona in a 89–68 loss to Cedevita, making 6 points and 6 rebounds. Through 5 Adriatic League games in the 2018–19 season, Prkačin averaged 2.2 points, 2.0 rebounds, and 0.4 assists per game. On 24 September 2020, Prkačin was promoted as the new team captain of Cibona, becoming the youngest captain in clubs history at 17 years and 10 months of age. Following the 2020–21 season Prkačin declared for the 2021 NBA draft. On July 19, 2021, he withdrawn his name from consideration for the 2021 NBA draft.

On July 21, 2022, Prkačin signed with Girona.

National team career

Youth teams 
Prkačin was a member of the Croatia under-17 team that took 7th place at the 2018 FIBA Under-17 Basketball World Cup. In this tournament he averaged 12.3 points, 10.9 rebounds and 1.9 blocks per game.

In the same summer of 2018, Prkačin played with the Croatia under-16 team that won the gold medal at the 2018 FIBA Europe Under-16 Championship held in Novi Sad. Over seven tournament games, he  averaged 18.6 points, 10.9 rebounds, 3.7 assists and 2.0 blocks per game and was honored with the tournament's MVP title along with a spot in the All-Star Five team.

Senior team 
On 27 November 2020, one day after his 18th birthday, Prkačin made his debut for the Croatia national team at the EuroBasket 2022 qualification in a 79–62 win over Turkey, making 6 points and one rebound.

Personal life 
Roko is a son of the former professional basketball player Nikola Prkačin.

References

External links 
 Profile at aba-liga.com
 Profile at realgm.com

2002 births
Living people
ABA League players
Basketball players from Zagreb
Bàsquet Girona players
Croatian men's basketball players
KK Cibona players
Power forwards (basketball)